Aattanayagann is a 2010 Indian Tamil-language masala film written and directed by debutante Krishnaram, starring Sakthi, Remya Nambeeshan, and Adithya in lead roles while Ravi Kale, Santhanam, and Meera Vasudevan play supporting roles. It released on 17 December 2010 to negative reviews. The film also gained popularity with Remya Nambeesan appearing glamorous in the songs for the first time in her career.

Plot
Lingam (Sakthi), the younger son of (Nassar), leads life in his own way. He, along with his set of friends (which includes (Santhanam) and Lollu Sabha Jeeva), go around town enjoying life. Lingam's father is against his ways and compares him with his elder brother Chandran (Adithya Menon), who runs a software firm in Hyderabad and is caring towards the family. Lingam falls in love with Radhika (Ramya Nambeesan) and decides to make her sister Indira (Meera Vasudevan) enter wedlock with his brother. After their marriage, Chandran takes Indira to Hyderabad, but she comes across a startling truth that Chandran is a dreaded don in Andhra Pradesh and that he had hid this truth to his family. Lingam has to set things right. He promises Indira and Radhika that he would bring his brother back to right ways. A hindrance to his mission is Pettinaidu (Ravi Kale), who has a score to settle with Chandran. Does Lingam succeed in his mission or not forms the climax.

Cast

 Sakthi as Lingam
 Ramya Nambeeshan as Radhika
 Adithya as Chandran
 Ravi Kale as Pettinaidu
 Santhanam as Lingam's friend
 Meera Vasudevan as Indhira Chandran
 Nassar as Lingam's father
 Lollu Sabha Jeeva as Lingam's friend
 R. Sundarrajan
 Balu Anand
 Ashwini
 Sachu
 Narsing Yadav

Soundtrack
Soundtrack was composed by Srikanth Deva.

Reception
Sify wrote "On the whole the film is ham-fisted and does not deliver the punch required from a mass masala." Behindwoods wrote "Aatta Nayagan might not be the best time pass entertainer you will stumble upon in movies but if you want to give the quintessential masala potboiler a chance once again, performed by an up and coming actor for once as opposed to the established ones, you might like the movie."

References

External links
 

2010 films
2010s masala films
2010s Tamil-language films
Films scored by Srikanth Deva